Rene Comeau (born December 14, 1994) is a Canadian curler from Fredericton, New Brunswick. He currently skips his own team on the World Curling Tour.

Career
Comeau won the 2014 New Brunswick Junior Curling Championship. He skipped the team of Daniel Wenzek, Jordon Craft and Ryan Freeze at the 2014 Canadian Junior Curling Championships. They finished the round robin with a 5–1 record and the championship pool with a 7–3 record, qualifying them for the semifinal. They breezed past Alberta to face Manitoba in the gold medal game. The teams were even in percentages however Manitoba had a key steal of four which was ultimately the difference in the game. New Brunswick earned the silver medal.

Comeau would win the provincial championship again in 2015 this time with a new team of Andrew Burgess, Alex MacNeil and Ryan Freeze. The team had an identical start as Comeau did in 2014, going 5–1 in the round robin but improving in the championship pool, finishing 8–2. The team would unfortunately not reach the final this year, losing to Saskatchewan 8–6 in the semifinal. The following season, Team Comeau played in the 2015 GSOC Tour Challenge Tier 2 event, where they finished 1–3.

Personal life
Comeau works as a Marketing Communications Specialist at NB Dental Society. He graduated from St. Thomas University. He attended high school at Leo Hayes in Fredericton, NB graduating in 2012

Teams

References

External links

Curlers from New Brunswick
Living people
1994 births
Canadian male curlers
Sportspeople from Fredericton
St. Thomas University (New Brunswick) alumni